U osvit zadnjeg dana (trans. At the Break of the Last Day) is the debut album by the Serbian rock band Bjesovi, released in 1991.

Track listing 
All tracks by Goran Marić and Zoran Marinković except where noted.

 "Zašto ovo ne bi bila ljubav" (02:39)
 "Džordžija" (Philippe Soupault, Zoran Marinković) (04:09)
 "Mislim na nju" (01:54)
 "On je sam" (03:49)
 "Meni ne treba ljubav" (02:12)
 "Dođi" (02:26)
 "Vule bule" (Tomi Sovilj) (02:06)
 "Dok postojim" (02:27)
 "Želja" (02:46)
 "Zli dusi" (Goran Marić, Gospel of Luke, Zoran Marinković, Zoran Niketić, Alexander Pushkin) (05:16)

Personnel 
 Božidar Tanasković (bass)
 Goran Ugarčina (drums)
 Predrag Dabić (guitar)
 Zoran Filipović (guitar)
 Goran Marić (vocals)
 Zoran Marinković (vocals)
 Dejan Marinković (vocals on track 4)
 Nikola Slavković (guitar on track 8)
 Vladimir Vesović (guitar on track 10)

External links 
 EX YU ROCK enciklopedija 1960-2006, Janjatović Petar; 
 U osvit zadnjeg dana at Discogs

Bjesovi albums
1991 debut albums